Digvijay Singh (born 30 January 1972) is a professional golfer from India currently playing on the Professional Golf Tour of India and the Asian Tour.

Singh was born in New Delhi to an Indian Army officer (Col Niranjan Singh). He had a solid amateur campaign, winning the Sri Lankan Amateur Championship in 1996 and 1997. He represented India in the Eisenhower Trophy in 1996 and 1998, and in the Nomura Cup in 1995 and 1997. He also played in the Asian Games in Bangkok in 1998. He turned professional in 1999.

Professional career
Singh currently holds 12 career wins on the PGTI, where he has had most of his success. He played his first full season on the Asian Tour in 2008 after 8 previous attempts to obtain his card. He enjoyed a 4th-place finish in his debut event in 2008 at the Indian Masters. He finished 2008 with $186,000 in earnings and a 30th-place finish on the Order of Merit.

Singh won the DDA Open in 2006 after Ashok Kumar made a crucial mistake on the 16th hole on Sunday. His first win on the PGTI came in 2008 at the Players Championship. It was his first professional win in over 2 years and 12th professional win.

Personal life
Singh is married to Chitra Sarwara daughter of former Haryana revenue minister Ch. Nirmal Singh, herself being an international volleyball player and currently serving as the municipal corporator for Ambala Nagar Nigam in Haryana.

Jyoti Randhawa is Singh's former brother-in-law. His sister Bollywood actress Chitrangada Singh was married to Randhawa before they were divorced. Randhawa introduced Singh to the game at age 17 and he is the one who encouraged Singh to turn professional.

Amateur wins
1996 Sri Lankan Amateur
1997 Sri Lankan Amateur

Professional wins (13)

Asian Tour wins (1)

1Co-sanctioned by the Professional Golf Tour of India

Professional Golf Tour of India wins (2)

1Co-sanctioned by the Asian Tour

Other wins
This list is incomplete
2000 BPGC Open
2002 Royal Springs Open, ColorPlus Open
2003 Surya Nepal Masters
2004 SRF All-India Matchplay Championship
2005 Airtel Masters
2006 DDA Open

Team appearances
Amateur
Nomura Cup (representing India): 1995, 1997
Eisenhower Trophy (representing India): 1996, 1998

Professional
World Cup (representing India): 2003

References

External links

Profile on PGTI's official site

Indian male golfers
Asian Tour golfers
Golfers at the 1998 Asian Games
Asian Games competitors for India
Golfers from Delhi
People from New Delhi
1972 births
Living people